is a 1950 black-and-white Japanese film directed by Hara Kenkichi.

Cast
 Kodayū Ichikawa (市川小太夫)
 Hibari Misora
 and others

References

Japanese black-and-white films
1950 films
Shochiku films
1950s Japanese films